is a live-action TV drama-comedy coproduced by Netflix and TV Tokyo. The plot revolves around Ametani Kantarou, played by Onoe Matsuya, a salaryman who works at a publishing house. His colleagues perceive him as a fast and efficient worker that everyone can trust, but in reality he slacks off from work to eat sweets. Its first season has twelve 24-minutes episodes and was released by TV Tokyo between 13 July and 29 September 2017, and by Netflix on 7 July 2017.

The series is based on the manga series Saboriman Ametani Kantarou written by Tensei Hagiwara and illustrated by Inoue ABD.

Although the story is fictional, the show features real locations and dessert hotspots in Tokyo. Each episode is centered on a typical Japanese dessert such as anmitsu, kakigōri, or mitsumame, or a Japanese interpretation of a foreign dish such as parfait, eclair, pancake or matcha bavarois.

Cast
Onoe Matsuya (尾上松也) as Ametani Kantarou
Ishikawa Ren (石川恋) as Dobashi Kanako
Minagawa Sarutoki (皆川猿時) as Miyake Toru
Onoue Hiroyuki (尾上寛之) as Yamaji Daisuke
Shimizu Hazuki (清水葉月) as Sano Erika

Others
Kentaro Ito (伊藤健太郎) as Takarabe Yutaka
Yagi Masayasu (八木将康) as Gogase Hiroki
Nakamura Yasuhi (中村靖日) as Matsuzawa Fuufu
Moriguchi Yoko (森口瑤子) as Ametani Eriko

Production credits
Original writing: Manga Saboriman Ametani Kantarou by Hagiwara Tensei (萩原天晴)
Screenwriter: Murakami Hiroki (村上大樹), Adachi Shin (足立紳), Yamaguchi Toshiyuki (山口智之), Sakai Yoshifumi (酒井善史)
Producer: Narita Gaku, Kobayashi Fuminori (小林史憲)
Director: Moriya Kentaro (守屋健太郎) 6 episodes, Ishida Yusuke (石田雄介) 4 episodes, Takashima Natsuki 2 episodes
Music: Makido Taro (牧戸太郎)
Theme song: "Ice Cream" (アイスクリーム) Itowokashi (イトヲカシ)

Episodes

See also 
 List of original programs distributed by Netflix
 Wagashi

References

External links
Official site

Japanese-language Netflix original programming
Japanese comedy television series
Cooking in anime and manga
Television shows set in Tokyo